Parliamentary elections were held in Albania on 25 April 2021. It took place during the COVID-19 pandemic.

Background
In the previous parliamentary elections in 2017, the Socialist Party won a majority with 74 of the 140 seats. In second place was the Democratic Party with 43 seats.

Electoral system
The 140 members of Parliament were elected in twelve multi-member constituencies based on the twelve counties by open list using proportional representation (using a 1% national electoral threshold) with seats allocated using the d'Hondt method. Significant changes to the electoral system were made a year before the 2021 elections by the Albanian parliament by amending several articles of the constitution. The ruling Socialist Party was accused by the united opposition, which two years earlier had left parliament and had not participated in the 2019 local elections, of violating the electoral law agreement they had previously agreed on. The majority defended itself by saying that the changes were made as a request of public opinion for the opening of the lists of deputies so that each voter chooses his preference. And that with the new system, Albania introduces a system well known and implemented by some European countries, such as Croatia, Slovenia, the Netherlands or Estonia, and moving away from the old system that was unique in its kind and that is not applied elsewhere - even though a number of European countries use closed-list proportional representation.

Demographic changes led to some changes in the number of seats for some constituencies; Tirana gained two seats, while Dibër and Gjirokastër both lost a seat.

Contesting parties

A total of 46 political parties, of which 5 parties are running for the first time, are registered with the Central Election Commission. In the elections of April 25, 2021, voters will have the opportunity to choose between 12 electoral subjects, of which 3 are coalitions, while in some constituencies five independent candidates also participate. The largest opposition party, the PD, formed the Partia Demokratike – Aleanca për Ndryshim (PD-AN) coalition by joining forces with twelve smaller parties. The LSI, also in opposition, formed a coalition of its own called Shqipëria – Shtëpia Fituese (ShQF). While the ruling party PS, decided to run in the elections alone but with the inclusion of some candidates of other allied parties.

Also, five independent candidates are participating in the elections as Elton Debreshi in Dibër County, Pal Shkambi in Shkodër County and three who are supported by the Vetëvendosje as Boiken Abazi in Tirana County, Iljaz Shehu in Lezhë County and Kreshnik Merxhani in Gjirokastër County.

Opinion polls

Nationwide

Results
The first exit-poll, from Euronews, suggested the victory of the Socialist Party tightly, projecting the 46% of the votes to Rama's candidacy, while the Democratic Party the 42%. On 27 April, Rama claimed "the most beautiful victory" and thanking "for trusting me to lead a third term".

On 28 April, 10 members of the Democratic Party's leadership called for Lulzim Basha's resignation as leader, alleging "The loss of the elections of 25 April 2021 by the Democratic Party has its responsibilities and first of all the chairman Lulzim Basha! He, among other things, has extinguished the democratic dream of hundreds of thousands of Albanians, losing two pairs of general elections, delivering the central government, the local government and the opposition in the hands of Edi Rama. Therefore, we demand the immediate and irrevocable resignation of the chairman of the Democratic Party, Lulzim Basha, the secretary general and the vice-chairmen." That same day, the candidate for the Social Movement for Integration Monika Kryemadhi congratulated "the oligarchs and the gangs, [because they are] the real winners" and apologized for the wrong electoral strategy, while accusing that vote buying took place in Durrës, Korçë and Berat.

MPs
{| cellpadding="1" cellspacing="3" style="margin:3px; border:1px solid #000000;"
! colspan="3"|
|-
| 

Blendi Klosi
Bardhyl Kollçaku
Hatixhe Konomi
Nasip Naço
Fadil Nasufi

Lavdrim Krrashi
Aurora Mara

Jurgis Çyrbja
Milva Ekonomi
Lefter Koka
Ilir Ndraxhi
Edi Rama
Rrahman Rraja
Klodiana Spahiu
Alban Xhelili

Besion Ajazi
Taulant Balla
Luan Duzha
Saimir Hasalla
Evis Kushi
Florenc Spaho
Dasantila Tahiraj
Klevis Xhoxhi

Ismet Beqiraj
Erion Braçe
Lindita Buxheli
Bujar Çela
Antoneta Dhima
Petro Koçi
Tatiana Piro
Gramoz Ruçi
Baftjar Zeqaj

Bledar Çuçi
Laert Duraj
Mirela Kumbaro

Blerina Gjylameti
Niko Peleshi
Ilirian Pendavinji
Ilir Topi
Olta Xhaçka
Enslemvera Zake

Gerta Duraku

Shpresa Marnoj
Eduard Ndreca
Lindita Nikolla

Benet Beci
Edona Bilali
Paulin Sterkaj

Arben Ahmetaj
Belinda Balluku
Alqi Bllako
Luljeta Bozo
Klotilda Bushka
Najada Çomo
Etilda Gjonaj
Toni Gogu
Ogerta Manastirliu
Ulsi Manja
Arben Pëllumbi
Orlando Rakipi
Xhemal Qefalia
Eduard Shalsi
Elisa Spiropali
Ermonela Valikaj
Etjen Xhafaj
Fatmir Xhafaj

Anila Denaj
Damian Gjiknuri
Niko Kuri
Ilir Metaj
Teuta Ramaj
Pranvera Resulaj
Vullnet Sinaj
Anduel Tahiraj

| 

Kasëm Mahmutaj
Tomor Alizoti

Kreshnik Çollaku
Xhelal Mziu
Dhurata Tyli (Çupi)

Merita Bakiu
Oerd Bylykbashi
Agron Duka (PAA)
Edi Paloka
Andia Ulliri (PLL)
Ferdinand Xhaferaj

Flutura Açka
Gazment Bardhi
Luçiano Boçi
Lefter Gështenja
Zheni Gjergji
Dashnor Sula

Enkelejd Alibeaj
Nustret Avdulla (PDIU)
Luan Baçi
Eralda Bano (Tase) (PR)
Ilda Dhori
Saimir Korreshi

Tritan Shehu

Seladin Jakupllari
Sorina Koti
Bledjon Nallbati
Ervin Salianji
Edmond Spaho

Isuf Çelaj
Flamur Hoxha

Agron Gjekmarkaj
Mark Marku
Lindita Metaliaj (PR)
Kastriot Piroli

Greta Bardeli
Helidon Bushati
Zef Hila
Emilja Koliqi
Ramadan Likaj

Lulzim Basha
Sali Berisha
Mesila Doda (PDIU)
Vangjel Dule (PBDNJ)
Grida Duma
Shpëtim Idrizi (PDIU)
Belind Këlliçi
Fatmir Mediu (PR)
Flamur Noka
Orjola Pampuri
Petrit Doda (PLL)
Agron Shehaj
Dashamir Shehi (LZhK)
Jorida Tabaku
Albana Vokshi

Arbi Agalliu
Bujar Leskaj
Fation Veizaj
Ina Zhupa

| 

Monika Kryemadhi

Agron Çela

Erisa Xhixho
Petrit Vasili

| 

Gledis Çeliku
Meri Markiçi

Gertjan Deda

 
|}

Notes

References

Albania
Parliamentary election
Albania
Parliamentary elections in Albania